Homalium mouo is a species of plant in the family Salicaceae. It is endemic to French Polynesia.

References

Flora of French Polynesia
mouo
Least concern plants
Taxonomy articles created by Polbot